railway station is the railway station serving the town of Llanelli, Carmarthenshire, Wales. The station and the majority of trains calling are operated by Transport for Wales.

It is located between two level crossings (known as East and West) that were previously upgraded in the 1970s. In 2015, Network Rail carried out a further upgrade which saw the control of these level crossings pass from the Grade-II listed  West signal box (which worked the two crossings here only since 1973) to Port Talbot Panel Signal Box using CCTV.

History

 railway station was the scene for the Llanelli Riots of 1911. The Llanelli Riots took place on 19 August 1911. Their immediate cause was the very first railway strike which lasted only two days. The strike started on Thursday evening, and by Saturday evening two young men had been shot dead by the military. One man was killed when a railway truck exploded and, on the following day, three more people died from their injuries. The story of the Riots is set in a period of great industrial unrest, and involves prominent figures on the international scene such as Lloyd George, Winston Churchill, King George V, and Kaiser Wilhelm of Germany.

Facilities
The station is staffed, with the ticket office on platform 2. A self-service ticket machine is provided for use when the booking office is closed and for collecting advance purchase/pre-paid tickets. The main buildings on this platform also house a newsagents shop, toilets, help point and post box. Platform 1 has canopies, bench seating and a customer help point. Digital CIS displays, timetable posters and automated announcements provide train running information. The platforms are linked by a footbridge with steps, but level access is possible to both platforms using the east level crossing and nearby road.

Services

There is a separate (roughly two-hourly service) between Swansea and  via  that calls, along with the twice-daily service to and from  that runs to connect with the ferry to/from Rosslare.

The daily Great Western Railway service between Carmarthen and London Paddington also calls here (three each way on Sundays). Great Western Railway also operates a summer Saturday service between London and Pembroke Dock.

Two trains each way operate on the line on Sundays. As the line from Swansea also enters  from the east, these trains must reverse direction here (in platform 2, which is signalled accordingly) to continue their journeys.

Rail and sea corridor to Ireland
Transport for Wales' boat trains to and from  serve the station. These connect with the Stena Line ferry to Rosslare Europort in Ireland with a daily morning and evening service in both directions. Two other services to and from there also call since the branch service was improved in 2011. This route has been in existence since 1906.

References

External links

Railway stations in Llanelli
DfT Category E stations
Former Great Western Railway stations
Railway stations in Great Britain opened in 1852
Heart of Wales Line
Railway stations served by Great Western Railway
Railway stations served by Transport for Wales Rail
1852 establishments in Wales